Vinitharius (Vinithar) was possibly a king of the Greuthungian Goths around 375-376 AD. Vinitharius is mentioned by Gothic historian Jordanes in Getica. According to him Vinitharius became the new king of the Greuthungi after the death of Ermanaric (Hermanaric). Ammianus Marcellinus reports that Ermanaric was succeeded by Vithimiris.

At that time those Goths fell under suzerainty of Huns.

Vinitharius is said to have fought the Antes who were led by their leader Boz. He defeated the Antes and crucified Boz, his eight sons and seventy noblemen. A year later Vinitharius is said to have been defeated on the river Erak by united forces of Huns and other Goths led by the Hun leader Balamber, who took the daughter of Vinitharius as his wife. The portrayal of Jordanes is problematic, in particular with regards to the Antes, who are only mentioned by other authors in the 6th century. It is possible that Vinitharius and Vithimiris refers to the same person.

References

Sources
 Hermann Reichert: Vinithar. In: Reallexikon der Germanischen Altertumskunde (RGA). 2. Auflage. Band 32, Walter de Gruyter, Berlin / New York 2006, S. 430–431
 Arne Søby Christensen: Cassiodorus, Jordanes and the History of the Goths: Studies in a Migration Myth. Museum Tusculanum Press, Kopenhagen 2002, S. 140–156.

Year of birth unknown
Year of death unknown
4th-century Gothic people
Gothic kings
Gothic warriors